Erik Thorstvedt (born 28 October 1962) is a Norwegian former professional footballer who played as a goalkeeper. He won 97 caps for the Norwegian national team, and was the starter in goal at the 1994 FIFA World Cup. He played for Viking, Eik-Tønsberg, Borussia Mönchengladbach, IFK Göteborg and Tottenham Hotspur.

Career
Thorstvedt was the first Norwegian to win the FA Cup when he won it with Spurs in 1991 and later became the second Norwegian to play in the Premier League. During his time at Tottenham Thorstvedt lived in the Hertfordshire town of Hoddesdon.

Thorstvedt retired in 1996 due to back injuries. After his career as a player, he worked as a goalkeeping coach with the Norwegian national team, and had a brief spell as Director of Football at Viking.

He has worked as an expert commentator/pundit for various TV channels, and was the TV-host on the Royal League matches shown on TVNorge. He was also the coach of Tufte IL, a team created for the reality-TV show Heia Tufte!. For his appearance in this show he was awarded the Se og Hør readers' TV personality of the year award. He had a weekly football show on Mondays called "Matchball Mandag" on TV2 where he and guests looked at games played in the Norwegian top division with a humorous approach.

Personal life
He is the father of Norwegian model and former MTV presenter Charlotte Thorstvedt and Sassuolo midfielder Kristian Thorstvedt.

Honours
Tottenham Hotspur
 FA Cup: 1990–91
 FA Charity Shield: 1991 (shared)

References

External links

 

1962 births
Living people
Norwegian footballers
Norway international footballers
Norway under-21 international footballers
Viking FK players
Olympic footballers of Norway
Association football goalkeepers
Eik-Tønsberg players
IFK Göteborg players
Borussia Mönchengladbach players
Tottenham Hotspur F.C. players
Premier League players
Bundesliga players
Allsvenskan players
Eliteserien players
Footballers at the 1984 Summer Olympics
1994 FIFA World Cup players
Kniksen Award winners
Expatriate footballers in Germany
Expatriate footballers in Sweden
Expatriate footballers in England
Norwegian expatriate footballers
Norwegian expatriate sportspeople in Germany
Sportspeople from Stavanger
Norwegian association football commentators
FA Cup Final players
Norwegian expatriate sportspeople in England
Norwegian expatriate sportspeople in Sweden